Bregu i Diellit (Sunny Shore) also informally known as Kodra e Diellit(Sunny Hill) is the largest and most populated district of Pristina, the capital of Kosovo.

Schools
 Shf. Iliria – located in Bregu i Diellit 2
 Shf.Ismail Qemaili – located in Kodra e Diellit

See also
 Pristina

References

External links
 Official site of Pristina

Geography of Pristina